J. Kemp Hannon (born January 10, 1946) is an American politician. A Republican, Hannon was a member of the New York State Senate from the 6th district in Nassau County between 1989 and 2018.

Biography
Hannon graduated from Chaminade High School (1963), Boston College (1967) and Fordham University School of Law (1970). He was Special Counsel to the law firm Farrell Fritz, P.C., ending the association on January 31, 2017. Hannon resides in Garden City, New York, with his wife Bronwyn and their twin daughters, Alexandra and Madeleine.

Hannon served in the New York State Assembly from 1977 to 1989, sitting in the 182nd, 183rd, 184th, 185th, 186th, 187th and 188th New York State Legislatures. In 1989, he was elected to the New York State Senate to fill the vacancy caused by the resignation of John R. Dunne. Hannon represented the 6th State Senate District, which includes Levittown, Massapequa, Garden City, Uniondale, Hempstead, Farmingdale, Franklin Square, Old Bethpage, Salisbury, Garden City South, Plainview, Lakeview, Plainedge, Island Trees and East Meadow.

A Republican, Hannon chaired the New York State Senate Health Committee for nearly two decades.

In 2011, Hannon voted against allowing same-sex marriage in New York during a Senate roll-call vote on the Marriage Equality Act, which passed after a close 33-29 vote. On January 14, 2013, Hannon voted in favor of the NY SAFE Act (a gun control bill), which the Senate passed 43-18. On June 10, 2014, the State Senate passed medical marijuana legislation that was later signed into law by Gov. Andrew Cuomo; Hannon, along with nine other Senate Republicans, voted against the bill.

On November 6, 2018, after having served 29 years in the New York State Senate, Hannon was unexpectedly defeated in his re-election bid by Democratic challenger Kevin Thomas.

References

External links

Farrell Fritz, P.C: J. Kemp Hannon

Republican Party New York (state) state senators
Republican Party members of the New York State Assembly
Politicians from Nassau County, New York
Chaminade High School alumni
Boston College alumni
Fordham University alumni
People from Garden City, New York
1946 births
Living people
21st-century American politicians